Burgess Creek is a  long second-order tributary to the Niobrara River in Knox County, Nebraska.

Course
Burgess Creek rises on the Sand Creek divide about 3 miles north-northeast of Sparta, Nebraska and then flows northwest to join the Niobrara River about 1 mile southwest of Niobrara, Nebraska.

Watershed
Burgess Creek drains  of area, receives about 23.9 in/year of precipitation, has a wetness index of 393.06, and is about 3.91% forested.

See also

List of rivers of Nebraska

References

Rivers of Knox County, Nebraska
Rivers of Nebraska